"Pendel" is a song by German recording artist Yvonne Catterfeld. It was written by Thomas Dörschel, Johannes Walter-Müller, and Alexander Freund and produced by Roland Spremberg for her sixth studio album Lieber so (2013). Built on a hand-clapped rhythm and pulsating beats, the uptempo song's instrumentation consists of soft percussion instruments and a piano. In "Pendel", Catterfeld talk about the changes that come from and may result in fortune, crises, and progress.
 
Selected as the album's lead single, "Pendel" was released as a digital single in November 2013 and reached number 59 on the German Singles Chart. It marked her lowest-charting single in years. An accompanying music video was directed by Christian Schwochow and released on 4 November 2013.

Formats and track listings

Charts

Weekly charts

References

External links
 YvonneCatterfeld.com — official site

2013 singles
2013 songs
Yvonne Catterfeld songs
Columbia Records singles
Hansa Records singles